Shobley is a small hamlet in the New Forest National Park of Hampshire, England. Its nearest town is Ringwood, which lies approximately 1.8 miles (2.9 km) west from the hamlet. It is in the civil Parish of Ellingham, Harbridge and Ibsley.

Villages in Hampshire
New Forest District